The 2011 ATP Challenger Trophy was a professional tennis tournament played on clay courts. It was the fifth edition of the tournament which was part of the 2011 ATP Challenger Tour. It took place in Trnava, Slovakia between 19 and 25 September 2011.

ATP entrants

Seeds

 1 Rankings are as of September 12, 2011.

Other entrants
The following players received wildcards into the singles main draw:
  Norbert Gomboš
  Jozef Kovalík
  Martin Přikryl
  Tristan-Samuel Weiβborn

The following players received entry from the qualifying draw:
  Kamil Čapkovič
  Iñigo Cervantes-Huegun
  Andrey Kuznetsov
  Michael Lammer

The following players received entry as a lucky loser into the singles main draw:
  Alexander Flock
  Roman Jebavý

Champions

Singles

 Iñigo Cervantes-Huegun def.  Pavol Červenák, 6–4, 7–6(7–3)

Doubles

 Colin Ebelthite /  Jaroslav Pospíšil def.  Aliaksandr Bury /  Andrei Vasilevski, 6–3, 6–4

External links
Official Website
ITF Search
ATP official site

 
ATP Challenger Trophy
2011 in Slovak tennis
STRABAG Challenger Open